Nadine is a 1987 American crime comedy film written and directed by Robert Benton and starring Jeff Bridges and Kim Basinger.

Plot
It's 1954 in Austin, Texas, and a slightly pregnant Nadine Hightower (Kim Basinger) is in a lot of trouble. She's gone to sleazy photographer Raymond Escobar's (Jerry Stiller) studio to reclaim some photos from him because they were "lots more artistic than I bargained for."  Escobar assures her that he knows Hugh Hefner and she will certainly make it to the top. But Nadine has second thoughts, as she wants her photos, and when she goes back to the studio to retrieve them, gets caught up in the middle of a murder scene. She grabs an envelope with her name on it and hightails it out of there.

Unfortunately, she gets the wrong pictures. She has stolen plans for a new highway development that ends up in the hands of her estranged husband Vernon (Jeff Bridges), a handsome, wise-mouthed bum who owns a  bar called the Blue Bonnet which no one goes to and that's not the worst of it. He's fooling around with a former Pecan Queen who works for the Lone Star Brewing company (Glenne Headly).  He sees a way to make a bundle of money in all this.

Shady real estate kingpin Buford Pope (Rip Torn) wants the plans back and will stop at nothing to get them. The couple is soon on the run not only from Buford but from police who believe they've killed Escobar.  All this time, Nadine and Vernon want a divorce, and Nadine hasn't told Vernon she's pregnant with his baby.

Cast
 Jeff Bridges as Vernon Hightower
 Kim Basinger as Nadine Hightower
 Rip Torn as Buford Pope
 Gwen Verdon as Vera
 Glenne Headly as Renée Lomax
 Jerry Stiller as Raymond Escobar

Production
The film was written specifically for Kim Basinger.
Shooting began on September 30, 1986 in Austin, Texas and further shooting took place in San Antonio.
The framed picture of Jeff Bridges in a uniform in the film is taken from The Last Picture Show (1971).
Much of the soundtrack was provided by the country group Sweethearts of the Rodeo.

Release

Critical reception
Rotten Tomatoes gives Nadine a rating of 46% from 13 reviews.

Home media
The film was released on VHS with a 4:3 ratio in 1988, and on DVD with a 1.85:1 ratio on July 5, 2005.

References

External links
 
 
 

1987 films
American romantic comedy films
1980s crime thriller films
1987 romantic comedy films
American comedy thriller films
1980s English-language films
Films set in Austin, Texas
Films shot in Austin, Texas
Films shot in San Antonio
Films set in 1954
TriStar Pictures films
Films with screenplays by Robert Benton
Films scored by Howard Shore
Films directed by Robert Benton
1980s American films